Federación Interamericana de Filatelia (FIAF), founded 8 November 1968, is an umbrella organisation for philately in North and South America.

Presidents
Past presidents include:
Emilio Obregón, México.
Herbert Moll, Perú.
Álvaro Bonilla Lara, Costa Rica. (twice)
Manuel M. Risueño, Chile.
Harry Sutherland, Canada.
Rómulo Lander, Venezuela.
Jairo Londoño Tamayo, Colombia.
Elio Mario Sinich, Argentina.
Enrique Oscar Buttini, Argentina.
Euclydes Pontes, Brasil. (twice)
Roberto Rosende, United States.
Enrique Oscar Buttini, Argentina.
Luis López López, Venezuela.
Hugo Goeggel, Colombia.
James Mazepa, United States
Patricio Aguirre, Chile.

See also
Fédération Internationale de Philatélie

References

External links
Official website.

Philatelic organizations
Organizations established in 1968